Peter Trudgill, FBA (born 7 November 1943) is an English sociolinguist, academic and author. 

Trudgill was born in Norwich, England and grew up in the area of Thorpe St Andrew. He attended the City of Norwich School from 1955. Trudgill studied modern languages at King's College, Cambridge and obtained a PhD from the University of Edinburgh in 1971. 

Before becoming professor of sociolinguistics at the University of Essex he taught in the Department of Linguistic Science at the University of Reading from 1970 to 1986. He was professor of English language and linguistics at the University of Lausanne, Switzerland, from 1993 to 1998, and then at the University of Fribourg, also in Switzerland, from which he retired in September 2005, and where he is now Professor Emeritus of English Linguistics.

He is Honorary Professor of Sociolinguistics at the University of East Anglia, in Norwich, England. On 2 June 1995 he received an honorary doctorate from the Faculty of Humanities at Uppsala University, Sweden. He also has honorary doctorates from UEA; La Trobe University, Melbourne; the University of Patras, Greece; and the University of British Columbia, Vancouver.

He has carried out linguistic fieldwork in Britain, Greece and Norway, and has lectured in most European countries, Canada, the United States, Colombia, Australia, New Zealand, India, Thailand, Hong Kong, Fiji, Malawi and Japan. Peter Trudgill has been the president of the Friends of Norfolk Dialect society since its inception in 1999. and contributes a regular column on language and languages in Europe to the New European newspaper.

Trudgill is one of the first to apply Labovian sociolinguistic methodology in the UK, and to provide a framework for studying dialect contact phenomena.

He has carried out studies on rhoticity in English, tracking trends in British rock music for decades; the Beatles’ decreased pronunciation of Rs over the course of the 1960s 

Trudgill is also the author of Chapter 1 ("The Meanings of Words Should Not be Allowed to Vary or Change") of the popular linguistics book "Language Myths" that he co-edited.

He is a member of the Norwegian Academy of Science and Letters, and a Fellow of the British Academy.

Since July 2015, Trudgill has written weekly columns relating to European languages in the weekly newspaper The New European. At the end of 2017, he signed the Declaration on the Common Language of the Croats, Serbs, Bosniaks and Montenegrins.

Bibliography
His works include:

 1974 The Social Differentiation of English in Norwich (based on his Ph.D. thesis)
 1974 Sociolinguistics: An Introduction to Language and Society
 1976 Introduction to Sociolinguistics 
 1975 Accent, Dialect and the School
 1979 English Accents and Dialects (with Arthur Hughes)
 1980 Dialectology (with J. K. Chambers)
 1982 International English (with Jean Hannah)
 1982 Coping With America (Blackwell, 2nd edition 1986)
 1983 On Dialect: Social and Geographical Perspectives
 1984 Language in the British Isles
 1984 Applied Sociolinguistics
 1986 Dialects in Contact 
 1990 The Dialects of England
 1990 Bad Language (with Lars Andersson)
 1992 Introducing Language and Society
 1998 Language Myths (with Laurie Bauer)
 2001 Alternative Histories of English (with Richard J. Watts)
 2002 Sociolinguistic Variation and Change
 2003 A Glossary of Sociolinguistics
 2003 Norfolk Origins 7: The Norfolk Dialect
 2004 New-Dialect Formation: The Inevitability of Colonial Englishes
 2004 New Zealand English: Its Origins and Evolution (with et al. Elizabeth Gordon, Lyle Campbell, Margaret Maclagan, Andrea Sudbury, Jennifer Hay)
 2008 In Sfakia: passing time in the wilds of Crete
 2010 The Lesser-Known Varieties of English: An Introduction (with Daniel Schreier, Edgar W. Schneider)
 2011 Sociolinguistic Typology: Social Determinants of Linguistic Complexity Oxford University Press
 2016 Dialect matters: respecting vernacular language. Cambridge University Press
 2018 Norwegian as a normal language and other studies in Scandinavian linguistics. Novus: Oslo

References

External links 
 Interviewed by Alan Macfarlane 20 November 2012 (video)

1943 births
Dialectologists
Living people
Linguists from the United Kingdom
Sociolinguists
Academics from Norwich
Alumni of King's College, Cambridge
Alumni of the University of Edinburgh
Academics of the University of East Anglia
Academics of the University of Essex
Fellows of the British Academy
People educated at the City of Norwich School
Academic staff of the University of Lausanne
Academic staff of the University of Fribourg
Members of the Norwegian Academy of Science and Letters
Signatories of the Declaration on the Common Language